SXY may refer to:

SXY, the Australian Securities Exchange code for Senex Energy, an Australian energy company
SXY, the IATA code for Sidney Municipal Airport, United States
SXY, the National Rail code for Saxilby railway station, Lincolnshire, England